The following is a list of episodes from the series Dorothy and the Wizard of Oz.

Series overview

Episodes

Season 1 (2017–18)

Season 2 (2018–19)  

The series was picked up for a second season, which started airing on the Boomerang Streaming Service on May 24, 2018.

Season 3 (2020)

References

Dorothy and the Wizard of Oz
Lists of Cartoon Network television series episodes